The 2000 Chatham Cup was the 73rd annual nationwide knockout football competition in New Zealand.

Up to the last 16 of the competition, the cup was run in three regions (northern, central, and southern), with an open draw from the quarter-finals on. National League teams received a bye until the Fourth Round (last 32). In all, 123 teams took part in the competition. Note: Different sources give different numberings for the rounds of the competition. Some record five rounds prior to the quarter-finals; others note a qualifying round followed by four full rounds.

The 2000 final
Napier City Rovers won the league/cup double. As the league changed from a club competition to one contested by regional franchises in 2004, they were the last team ever to do so.

The Jack Batty Memorial Cup is awarded to the player adjudged to have made to most positive impact in the Chatham Cup final. The winner of the 2008 Jack Batty Memorial Cup was Jimmy Cudd of Napier City Rovers.

Results

Third Round

* Won on penalties by Birkenhead United (8-7)

Fourth Round

* Won on penalties by Bay Olympic (5-4)

Fifth Round

Quarter-finals

Semi-finals

Final

References

Rec.Sport.Soccer Statistics Foundation New Zealand 2000 page
UltimateNZSoccer website 2000 Chatham Cup page

Chatham Cup
Chatham Cup
Chatham Cup
Chat